Sagarmatha Television, is a Nepali Television channel established in July 2007. It is a News channel and broadcasts in Nepali language. STV is a leader in live and breaking news telecast and prompt information delivery of current affairs in Nepal. STV uses bureaus in all districts and overseas countries and makes every effort to keep the viewers informing from uniquely different angles. Its headquarters are in Babarmahal, Kathmandu.

It has the slogan "तपाईंको तेश्रो आँखा" (Your Third Eye), this is the Nepal's first news channel. This is the only one channel that broadcasts news in  Nepali Language.

See also
List of Nepali Television Stations
ABC Television
 History of Television in Nepal (biplav.com)

References

https://web.archive.org/web/20090705085201/http://sagarmatha.tv/index.php

Television channels in Nepal
Television channels and stations established in 2007
2007 establishments in Nepal